Coldworker was a Swedish deathgrind band, formed in early 2006. The band signed a deal with Relapse Records in June 2006, and since then released three studio albums, the debut The Contaminated Void, in November 2006, followed by Rotting Paradise, in May 2008, and The Doomsayer's Call in February 2012. The band split up in July 2013.

History 
Coldworker was formed in early 2006 by Nasum's former drummer Anders Jakobson, who recruited guitarist Anders Bertilsson (formerly of The Project Hate MCMXCIX) and bassist Oskar Pålsson. They began rehearsing and writing songs and in March 2006 were joined by guitarist André Alvinzi (also in Carnal Grief). In April 2006, they settled on the name Coldworker, and were joined by singer Joel Fornbrant.

Coldworker played their first concert in June 2006, and soon after started recording their debut studio album, The Contaminated Void. The album was mixed by Dan Swanö and mastered by Peter In De Betou. In July 2006, the band signed a record deal with Relapse Records.

Coldworker recorded their second album, Rotting Paradise, between December 2007 and January 2008; it was mixed and mastered by Dan Swanö at Unisound Studios. Around this time Alvinzi left the band, to be replaced by Daniel Schröder. Rotting Paradise was released worldwide in May 2008 through Relapse Records on vinyl and CD.

Members

Current members
Joel Fornbrant - vocals (2006-2013)
Anders Bertilsson - guitar (2006-2013)
Oskar Pålsson - bass (2006-2013)
Anders Jakobson - drums (2006-2013)
Daniel Schröder - guitar (2007-2013)

Former members
André Alvinzi – guitar (2006-2007)

Discography

References

External links
Coldworker.com

Swedish death metal musical groups
Musical groups established in 2006
Musical groups disestablished in 2013
Relapse Records artists